Senegal's rail network consists of 906 km of railway at  gauge, and 36 km of  gauge. The metre-gauge network is part of the Dakar–Niger Railway which crosses the border to Mali. The railway is operated by Transrail, managed by the Belgian company Vecturis.

The single standard gauge line is a commuter railway in Dakar, the Train Express Regional Dakar-AIBD, which opened in 2021.

History 
Senegal was formerly part of the federation of French West Africa so the history of its railways is closely linked to that of its neighbours.

Dakar–Saint-Louis railway

This was the first railway line in French West Africa when it opened in 1885. It is now out of service.

Dakar–Niger Railway

Construction work on the Dakar–Niger Railway began at the end of the 19th century. The line was completed at the beginning of the 20th century.

Petit train de banlieue

The Petit train de banlieue (PTB) is a passenger train providing regular commuter services between Dakar railway station and Thiès, via Thiaroye and Rufisque.  It was inaugurated in December 1987.

Train Express Regional 

This line was in construction from 2016 and was inaugurated in 2019. It links Dakar with Blaise Diagne International Airport.

Developments since 2000

In August 2006 RITES of India was to supply five metre-gauge locomotives, with vacuum brakes converted to air brakes.

In October 2007 70 air braked coaches were ordered from Rail Coach Factory in India. A  rail line was planned to Faleme River region of South East Senegal for iron ore traffic.

In 2010, the Faleme project has been delayed by disputes between the leaseholders. In the meantime, the Dakar-Port Sudan Railway project surfaced.

A goods railway was constructed from Thies to a mineral sand mine situated to the west. The track from Thies to Dakar was refurbished, and several trains a week now operate to Dakar port.

See also
 Railway stations in Senegal
 Transport in Senegal
 West Africa Regional Rail Integration

References

External links 
 Transrail s.a.